The Bajaj Cub was a limited edition release motor scooter from Bajaj Auto. A suitable electronic ignition system for scooters was developed and introduced on the "Bajaj-Cub". It was released in 1987 and was quite quickly discontinued. It usually came with a detachable single footrest but an all-round foot-rest was optional. It gave a mileage of 40 km/L on roads with good maintenance.

This model was discontinued due to the huge success of its higher powered 4 speed, 150cc model, the Chetak. The Cub had a 100cc engine, and a smaller wheel diameter compared to the Chetak. The Chetak had better pick-up but a lower mileage of fuel.

It was priced at around INR 9500 approx. (190.550 US$) at the time of its release. In 1991 it costed 19000Rs. On road price Bangalore.

External links
 Bajaj Auto official site
  Wallet watch by Satyam Infoway Ltd.

Indian motor scooters
Chetak

it:Bajaj Chetak